The Israel Museum (Muze'on Yisrael) is an art and archaeological museum in Jerusalem. It was established in 1965 as Israel's largest and foremost cultural institution, and one of the world’s leading encyclopaedic museums. It is situated on a hill in the Givat Ram neighborhood of Jerusalem, adjacent to the Bible Lands Museum, the Knesset, the Israeli Supreme Court, and the Hebrew University of Jerusalem.

Its holdings include the world's most comprehensive collections of the archaeology of the Holy Land, and Jewish art and life, as well as significant and extensive holdings in the fine arts, the latter encompassing eleven separate departments: Israeli Art, European Art, Modern Art, Contemporary Art, Prints and Drawings, Photography, Design and Architecture, Asian Art, African Art, Oceanic Art, and Arts of the Americas. 

Among the unique objects on display are the Venus of Berekhat Ram, the interior of a 1736 Zedek ve Shalom synagogue from Suriname, necklaces worn by Jewish brides in Yemen, a mosaic Islamic prayer niche from 17th-century Persia, and a nail attesting to the practice of crucifixion in Jesus' time. An urn-shaped building on the grounds of the museum, the Shrine of the Book, houses the Dead Sea Scrolls and artifacts discovered at Masada. It is one of the largest museums in the region.

History

Jerusalem mayor Teddy Kollek was the driving spirit behind the establishment of the Israel Museum, one of the leading art and archaeology museums in the world. The museum houses works dating from prehistory to the present day in its Archaeology, Fine Arts, and Jewish Art and Life Wings, and features extensive holdings of biblical and Land of Israel archaeology. Since its establishment in 1965, the museum has built up a collection of nearly 500,000 objects, representing a broad sample of world material culture.

On October 25, 2017, Prof. Ido Bruno was appointed Director of the Israel Museum in Jerusalem as the Anne and Jerome Fisher Director. Bruno served as a professor in the Industrial Design Department of the Bezalel Academy of Arts & Design, Jerusalem. He brings to the position decades of experience as a curator and designer of exhibitions presented in Israel and across the world with a focus on art, archeology, science, and history. He was unanimously elected by the museum's board of directors, chaired by Isaac Molho, following an extensive search and review process of candidates from Israel and abroad. Bruno assumed his position at the museum in November 2017.

Denis Weil, formerly Dean of the Institute of Design at the Illinois Institute of Technology, became Museum Director in March 2020.

From 1965, the museum was housed in a series of masonry buildings designed by the Russian-born Israeli architect Alfred Mansfeld. A $100-million campaign to renovate the museum and double its gallery space was completed by Israeli architects Efrat-Kowalsky Architects who renovated the existing buildings in July 2010. The wings for archaeology, the fine arts, and Jewish art and life were completely rebuilt and the original buildings were linked through a new entrance pavilion. The passageways that connect between the buildings and five new pavilions were designed by James Carpenter.

Gallery

Archaeology Wing
The Samuel and Saidye Bronfman Archaeology Wing tells the story of the ancient Land of Israel, home to peoples of different cultures and faiths, using unique examples from the museum's collection of Holy Land archaeology, the foremost holding in the world. Organized chronologically, from prehistory through the Ottoman Empire, the transformed wing presents seven “chapters” of this archaeological narrative, weaving together momentous historical events, cultural achievements, and technological advances, while providing a glimpse into the everyday lives of the peoples of the region. This narrative is supplemented by thematic groupings highlighting aspects of ancient Israeli archaeology that are unique to the region's history, among them Hebrew writing, glass, and coins. Treasures from neighboring cultures that have had a decisive impact on the Land of Israel – such as Egypt, the Near East, Greece and Italy, and the Islamic world – are on view in adjacent and connecting galleries. A special gallery at the entrance to the wing showcases new findings and other temporary exhibition displays.

Highlights on view include Pilate Stone, "House of David" inscription (9th century BCE), a comparative display of two shrines (8th–7th century BCE); the Heliodorus Stele (178 BCE), royal Herodian bathhouse (1st century BCE); Hadrian's Triumph: inscription from a triumphal arch (136 CE), the Mosaic of Rehob (3rd century CE) and gold-glass bases from the Roman catacombs (4th century CE); and the Ossuary of Jesus son of Joseph.

Shrine of the Book

The Shrine of the Book houses the Dead Sea Scrolls, the oldest biblical manuscripts in the world, as well as rare early medieval biblical manuscripts. The scrolls were discovered in 1947–56 in 11 caves in and around the Wadi Qumran. An elaborate planning process of seven years led to the building's eventual construction in 1965. This was funded by the family of David Samuel Gottesman, a Hungarian émigré, the philanthropist who had purchased the scrolls as a gift to the State of Israel.

The building consists of a white dome over a building located two-thirds below the ground. The dome is reflected in a pool of water that surrounds it. Across from the white dome is a black basalt wall. The colors and shapes of the building are based on the imagery of the scroll of the War of the Sons of Light Against the Sons of Darkness; the white dome symbolizes the Sons of Light and the black wall symbolizes the Sons of Darkness. The interior of the shrine was designed to depict the environment in which the scrolls were found. There is also a permanent display on life in the Qumran, where the scrolls were written. The entire structure was designed to resemble a pot in which the scrolls were found. The shrine was designed by Armand Bartos and Frederick Kiesler, and was opened in 1965.

As the fragility of the scrolls makes it impossible to display them all on a continuous basis, a system of rotation is used. After a scroll has been exhibited for 3–6 months, it is removed from its showcase and placed temporarily in a special storeroom, where it "rests" from exposure. The museum also holds other rare ancient manuscripts and displays the Aleppo Codex, which is from the 10th-century and is believed to be the oldest Bible codex in Hebrew.

Second Temple model

Adjacent to the Shrine is the Model of Jerusalem in the Second Temple Period, which reconstructs the topography and architectural character of the city as it was prior to its destruction by the Romans in 66 CE, and provides historical context to the Shrine's presentation of the Dead Sea Scrolls. Originally constructed on the grounds of Jerusalem's Holyland Hotel, the model, which includes a replica of Herod's Temple, is now a permanent feature of the museum's  campus.

Fine Arts Wing
The Edmond and Lily Safra Fine Arts Wing reflects the wide-ranging, interdisciplinary nature of the museum's collections, encompassing works of art from across the ages in Western and non-Western cultures. The wing has been reorganized to highlight connections among works from its diverse curatorial collections, which include European Art, Modern Art, Contemporary Art, Israeli Art, the Arts of Africa, Oceania, and the Americas, Asian Art, Photography, Design and Architecture, and Prints and Drawings. Installations are organized to underscore visual affinities and shared themes and to inspire new insight into the arts of different times and places, as well as an appreciation of the common threads of human culture. The reconfigured wing includes the museum's first permanent galleries for Israeli art, more than doubled gallery space for the museum's extensive collections in modern art, providing meaningful connecting points between Western and non-Western holdings, and a full 2,200-square-meter (7,200-square-foot) gallery floor devoted to changing displays from the museum's collection of contemporary art.

Highlights newly on view include The Noel and Harriette Levine Photography Collection, The Jacques Lipchitz Collection, Gustave Courbet, Jura Landscape with Shepherd and Donkey (ca. 1866), Alberto Giacometti, Alfred Barye, Diego in the Studio (1952), Ohad Meromi, and The Boy from South Tel Aviv (2001).

European, Modern, and Israeli art 

The Israel Museum holds a large collection of paintings representing a wide range of periods, styles, subjects, and regions of origin. Painters in the collection include such international figures as Rembrandt and Camille Pissarro as well as such Israeli and Jewish artists as Marc Chagall, Abel Pann, and Reuven Rubin.

The Israel Museum's commitment to Israeli art is central to its mission. As the country's national museum, it plays a major role in preserving Israel's artistic heritage by collecting works by Israeli artists - in Israel and abroad - and by encouraging Israel's artists to develop in their careers. The museum's Israeli Art collection spans the late 19th century through today, and it reflects the evolution of Israel's cultural history in the visual arts. The Information Center for Israeli Art provides scholars and the public with comprehensive archival information on several thousand Israeli artists, including biographical notes, press materials, videos, photographs, and other forms of documentation.

Mandel Wing for Jewish Art and Life

The holdings of the Jack, Joseph, and Morton Mandel Wing for Jewish Art and Life represent the religious and secular material culture of Jewish communities worldwide, spanning centuries from the Middle Ages to the present day. The collection reflects the depth and beauty of Jewish heritage and creativity as well as the aesthetic and stylistic influences of other cultures in places where Jews lived.

The origins of the collection can be traced to the early twentieth century with the establishment of the Bezalel National Museum under the directorship of Mordechai Narkiss, who expanded significantly the collection of ritual art objects through important treasures rescued between the two world wars and after the Holocaust. Later on, this treasure was integrated in the newly established Israel Museum in 1965 into the departments of Jewish Art and of Jewish Ethnography. In 1995 they were united into a new independent wing. 
Over the years, the wing's holdings have been strengthened through gifts and acquisitions of individual objects, gifts of private collections, and fieldwork within communities in Israel and abroad. The wing's prominent collections are the Stieglitz Collection and the Feuchtwanger Collection for Jewish ritual objects, Torah scroll ornaments, and life cycle objects, as well as the Schulmann Collection and Rathjens Collection for North African and Yemenite material culture, dress, jewelry and ritual objects.

The wing's collection contains many unique treasures, among them, are rare manuscripts, four reconstructed synagogue interiors, a wide variety of ceremonial and ritual objects, as well as diverse material culture including dress, jewelry, and everyday artifacts.

In the new permanent display, important objects drawn from this extensive collection from the public and the private realm, are integrated into a multifaceted narrative. This comparative display explores the objects’ history and the social context in which they were used while underscoring their aesthetic qualities and emotional resonance. It reflects a vivid cultural tapestry weaving together the individual and the communal, the sacred and the mundane, the heritage of the past and the creative innovations of the present.

Five principal themes unfold as you walk through the galleries:

The Rhythm of Life: Birth, Marriage, Death - highlighting the coexistence of joy and sadness, life, and death, memory and hope at each of these junctures in the life cycle.
Illuminating the Script - a display from our collection of rare medieval and Renaissance Hebrew manuscripts, shedding light on their history and revealing their artistry. 
The Synagogue Route: Holiness and Beauty - Four restored interiors of synagogues from Europe, Asia, and the Americas, along with Torah scroll ornaments, show the unity and diversity of Jewish religious architecture and ritual objects.
The Cycle of the Jewish Year - The sanctity of the Sabbath and the traditional celebration of religious holidays, as well as the new commemoration of special days in the State of Israel, have given rise to a wealth of finely crafted objects and imaginative artworks. 
Costume and Jewelry: A Matter of Identity- Environment, custom, and religious law all play their role in creating the rich variety of Jewish dress and jewelry from East and West presented here.

Isidore and Anne Falk Information Center for Jewish Art and Life
The Information Center has a research library and a unique archival collection, constantly growing, of some twenty thousand photographs. Many of them are extremely rare, documenting the daily life of Jewish communities around the world, some no longer exist, including images of synagogues, cemeteries, ceremonial objects and many other subjects.

The information center offers access to resources of the collections as well as virtual tours in former exhibitions in order to broaden and deepen knowledge behind the objects in the wing's collections.

Art Garden 

The Billy Rose Art Garden is a 20-dunam garden featuring modern and abstract sculptures. The garden, designed for the original campus by Japanese-American sculptor Isamu Noguchi, is counted among the finest outdoor sculpture settings of the 20th century. An Oriental landscape combined with an ancient Jerusalem hillside, the garden serves as the backdrop for the Israel Museum's display of the evolution of the modern western sculptural tradition. On view are works by modern masters including Jacques Lipchitz, Henry Moore, Claes Oldenburg, Pablo Picasso, Auguste Rodin, and David Smith, together with more recent site-specific commissions by such artists as Magdalena Abakanowicz, Mark Dion, James Turrell, and Micha Ullman.

Youth Wing
The Ruth Youth Wing for Art Education was opened in 1966. It is unique in its size and scope of activities, presents a wide range of programming to more than 100,000 schoolchildren each year, and features exhibition galleries, art studios, classrooms, a library of illustrated children's books, and a recycling room. Special programs foster intercultural understanding between Arab and Jewish students and reach out to the wide spectrum of Israel's communities. The wing combines annual original artworks of Israeli and international artists, with educational activities. There are also a variety of workshops for children and adults.

Rockefeller Archaeological Museum and the Ticho House
In addition to the extensive programming offered on its main campus, the Israel Museum also operates two off-site locations: the Rockefeller Archaeological Museum that opened in 1938 for the display of artifacts unearthed mainly in the excavations conducted in Mandatory Palestine, in the 1920s and 1930s; and Ticho House, which offers an ongoing program of exhibitions by younger Israeli artists in a historic house and garden setting.

Management

Funding
The Israel Museum receives only 10% to 12% of its operating budget from state and municipal sources. The Israeli government provides varying amounts of funds each year. The institution must raise 88% of its yearly operating budget, all of its $200 million endowment and $100 million for its recent capital project, while paying 17.5% VAT as well as real-estate taxes on the campus property.

The most active of the international support groups of the museum, the American Friends of the Israel Museum, raised $270 million in cash, of which $47 million is in endowment funds, and donated $210 million in the art from 1972 to 2008. In 2009, the Israel Museum received $12 million from the Edmond J. Safra Philanthropic Foundation, towards the renovation, reinstallation, and endowment of its fine arts wing, which will be renamed after Edmond and Lily Safra.

Attendance
As of 2012, attendance was about 827,000 per year.

Prizes awarded by the museum

Among the prizes awarded by the museum is the Jesselson Prize for Contemporary Judaica Design, which recognizes outstanding design of Jewish ritual objects. Winners include Moshe Zabari (1990).

Notable staff
 Dov Gottesman
 Nissan N. Perez
 Yigal Zalmona
 Haim Gitler

See also
 Isaiah scroll

Further reading
The Jewish Wardrobe: From the Collection of the Israel Museum, Jerusalem, Concept and Project Director: Daisy Raccah-Djivre, Editor: Dr. Esther Juhasz, Associate Editor: No'am Bar'am-Ben-Yossef, The Israel Museum, Jerusalem, and 5 Continents Edition, Milan, 2012. 
Benjamin, Chaya, Early Israeli Arts and Crafts: Bezalel Treasures from the Alan B. Slifka Collection in the Israel Museum, The Israel Museum, Jerusalem 2008.
Benjamin, Chaya, The Stieglitz Collection: Masterpieces of Jewish Art, The Israel Museum 1987. 
Shachar, Isaiah, Jewish tradition in art; The Feuchtwanger collection of Judaica, The Israel Museum, Jerusalem 1971.

References

External links
  
  
  
Virtual tour of the Israel Museum provided by Google Arts & Culture

 
Israel
Museums established in 1965
Museums in Jerusalem
History museums in Israel
Art museums and galleries in Israel
Archaeology of Israel
Archaeological museums in Israel
Modernist architecture in Israel
Sculpture gardens, trails and parks in Asia
Museums established in 1926
Egyptological collections
Museums of ancient Rome
Museums of Ancient Near East in Israel
Pre-Columbian art museums
Asian art museums in Israel
1965 establishments in Israel